"Arabella" is a song by English rock band Arctic Monkeys from their fifth studio album, AM (2013). The song was confirmed as the album's fifth single by the band and their label Domino and impacted radio in Italy on 28 January 2014 and the United Kingdom on 10 March 2014. A physical 7" vinyl single was also planned for release on 28 March 2014, but was ultimately cancelled.

Composition
The song is described by Far Out magazine as a "fusing of late ‘90s hip-hop and R&B with ‘70s hard rock," they also noted musical references "to the likes of Sabbath or Zeppelin and the futurism of Dr. Dre, combined with lyrical extracts like “Arabella’s got a ‘70s head, but she’s a modern lover…she’s made of outer space”".

Performances
"Arabella" was played live for the first time on 30 August 2013, during Zurich Openair festival performance, which was a part of the AM Tour. The band often play part of Black Sabbath's "War Pigs" during live performances of the song, done to give Alex Turner time to equip a guitar for the solo. The part "War Pigs" is played due to the similarities between the riffs of the two songs.

Music video
An official music video for the song, directed by English director Jake Nava, premiered on 2 March 2014.

Commercial performance
In September 2013, following the release of AM, "Arabella" charted at number 155 on the UK Singles Chart, number 26 on the UK Indie Chart, and number 7 on the Ultratip chart of Belgium's Flanders region. Following the announcement of its single release in March 2014, the single re-entered the UK Singles and Indie charts, peaking at numbers 70 and 9 respectively. "Arabella" was added to the BBC Radio 1 playlist on the B-list on 10 February 2014.

Personnel

Arctic Monkeys
Alex Turner – lead vocals, guitar solo, tambourine
Jamie Cook – lead guitars
Nick O'Malley – bass guitar, backing vocals
Matt Helders – drums, percussion, backing vocals

Technical personnel
James Ford – production, tambourine
Ross Orton – co-production
Ian Shea – engineering
Tchad Blake – mixing
Brian Lucey – mastering

Charts

Certifications

Release history

References

2013 songs
2014 singles
Arctic Monkeys songs
Domino Recording Company singles
Music videos directed by Jake Nava
Songs written by Alex Turner (musician)
Song recordings produced by James Ford (musician)
Songs about fictional female characters
Songs written by Ross Orton
Glam metal songs